Pat Galloway (born 1957) is an American engineer. She received a bachelor's degree in civil engineering from Purdue University in 1978, an MBA from the New York Institute of Technology, and a Ph.D. from Kochi University of Technology in 2005.  She is a certified PE (Professional Engineer).

Career 
Galloway is the CEO of Nielsen-Wurster Group. In 2013, she created a proposal for engineering education reform for the American Society of Civil Engineers that has been hailed as "groundbreaking" by the president of the Georgia Institute of Technology, G. Wayne Clough.  Galloway served on the US National Science Board from 2006-2012, was inducted into the National Academy of Construction, and was the first female president of ASCE (American Society of Civil Engineers) from 2003 to 2004.

References 

1957 births
Living people
21st-century American engineers